Arenaria, a Latin word meaning sand-loving (or psammophilic), may refer to:

Genera
 Arenaria (bird), the turnstones, a bird genus of the family Scolopacidae
 Arenaria (plant), the sandworts, a plant genus of the family Caryophyllaceae

Species
 Phengaris alcon arenaria, the Dutch alcon blue, an extinct subspecies of the alcon blue butterfly that was endemic to the Netherlands
 Meloidogyne arenaria thamesi, a synonym for Meloidogyne thamesi, the Thames' root-knot nematode, a plant-pathogenic nematode species

See also
 Arenarium
 Arenarius (disambiguation)